Every Secret Thing is a 2004 crime novel written by Laura Lippman in 2003.

Awards 
 Anthony Awards for Best Novel – 2004
 Barry Award for Best Crime Novel – 2004

Film adaptation 

Deadline reported on August 10, 2010 that actress Frances McDormand has bought the rights of the 2004 crime novel Every Secret Thing written by Laura Lippman, she'll produce the film with her partner Anthony Bregman. On July 31, 2012 Variety posted the news that Nicole Holofcener has written the script for the film and Amy J. Berg is set to direct the film to make her directorial debut.  It was released on April 20, 2014.

References 

American crime novels
2003 American novels
American novels adapted into films
Anthony Award-winning works
Barry Award-winning works
William Morrow and Company books